Cyril Harcourt (1872–1924) was a noted writer for the London and New York City stages who appeared in his own plays.

Biography
Born in Hendon, Middlesex, on 30 December 1872, Cyril Harcourt (originally named Cyril Worsley Perkins), was educated at Bedford School between 1881 and 1888. He intended to take holy orders but instead qualified as an engineer. He then studied for the operatic stage, ultimately becoming an actor in his own plays. His first play, The Axis, was produced for the Criterion Theatre in July 1905, and was followed by The Reformer in 1907, and The Recompense in 1910. He had greater success with A Place in the Sun, at the Comedy Theatre in 1913, in which he played a brilliant man of letters soured by early poverty. However, his greatest success and his most well-known play was A Pair of Silk Stockings, produced at the Criterion Theatre in 1914, which transferred to New York City and had been adapted for the cinema three times by 1932. In May 1917, Wanted, A Husband, starring Gladys Cooper, was produced at the Playhouse Theatre. In the Night was produced at the Kingsway Theatre in 1919, and Will You Kiss Me? was produced at the Comedy Theatre in 1920.
Cyril Harcourt set up a management company with Norman Pritchard at the Comedy Theatre, New York, in 1918. He died in Menton, Alpes-Maritimes, France, on 4 March 1924, aged 52.

Plays
The Axis, Criterion Theatre, 1905
The Reformer, Criterion Theatre, 1907
The Recompense, Criterion Theatre, 1910
A Place in the Sun, Comedy Theatre, 1913
A Pair of Silk Stockings, Criterion Theatre, 1914
Wanted, A Husband, Playhouse Theatre, 1917
In the Night, Kingsway Theatre, 1919
Will You Kiss Me?, Comedy Theatre, 1920

Film adaptations
A Lady's Name, 1916
A Pair of Silk Stockings, 1918
In the Night, 1922
They Just Had to Get Married,  1932

Novels
The World’s Daughter, 1913
First Cousin to a Dream, 1914

References

External links
http://www.imdb.com/name/nm0361986/
http://www.ibdb.com/person.php?id=44083

1872 births
1924 deaths
English male stage actors
People educated at Bedford School
20th-century English male actors
20th-century English dramatists and playwrights
English male dramatists and playwrights
20th-century English male writers